Direct collapse black holes are high-mass black hole seeds, putatively formed within the redshift range , when the Universe was about 100–250 million years old. Unlike seeds formed from the first population of stars (also known as Population III stars), direct collapse black hole seeds are formed by a direct, general relativistic instability. They are very massive, with a typical mass at formation of ~. This category of black hole seeds was originally proposed theoretically to alleviate the challenge in building supermassive black holes already at redshift , as numerous observations to date have confirmed.



Formation 
The environmental physical conditions to form a DCBH (as opposed to a cluster of stars) are the following:

 Metal-free gas (gas containing only hydrogen and helium).
 Atomic-cooling gas.
 Sufficiently large flux of Lyman-Werner photons, in order to destroy hydrogen molecules, which are very efficient gas coolants.

The previous conditions are necessary to avoid gas cooling and, hence, fragmentation of the primordial gas cloud. At this density, the object undergoes to a general relativistic instability, which leads to the formation of a black hole of a typical mass ~, and up to 1 million solar masses. The occurrence of the general relativistic instability, as well as the absence of the intermediate stellar phase, led to the denomination of direct collapse black hole. In other words, these objects collapse directly from the primordial gas cloud, not from a stellar progenitor as prescribed in standard black hole models.

A computer simulation reported in July 2022 showed that a halo at the rare convergence of strong, cold accretion flows can create massive black holes seeds without the need for ultraviolet backgrounds, supersonic streaming motions or even atomic cooling. Cold flows produced turbulence in the halo, which suppressed star formation. In the simulation, no stars formed in the halo until it had grown to 40 million solar masses at a redshift of 25.7 when the halo’s gravity was finally able to overcome the turbulence; the halo then collapsed and formed two supermassive stars that died as DCBHs of 31,000 and 40,000 solar masses.

Demography 
Direct collapse black holes are generally thought to be extremely rare objects in the high-redshift Universe, because the three fundamental conditions for their formation (see above in section Formation) are challenging to be met all together in the same gas cloud. Current cosmological simulations suggest that DCBHs could be as rare as only about 1 per cubic gigaparsec at redshift 15. The prediction on their number density is highly dependent on the minimum flux of Lyman-Werner photons required for their formation and can be as large as  DCBHs per cubic gigaparsec in the most optimistic scenarios.

Detection 
In 2016, a team led by Harvard University astrophysicist Fabio Pacucci identified the first two candidate direct collapse black holes, using data from the Hubble Space Telescope and the Chandra X-ray Observatory. The two candidates, both at redshift  , were found in the CANDELS GOODS-S field and matched the spectral properties predicted for this type of astrophysical sources. In particular, these sources are predicted to have a significant excess of infrared radiation, when compared to other categories of sources at high redshift. Additional observations, in particular with the upcoming James Webb Space Telescope, will be crucial to investigate the properties of these sources and confirm their nature.

See also 

 Primordial black hole

References

Astronomy
Astrophysics
Physical cosmology

Galaxies
Black holes
Supermassive black holes
Theory of relativity